Anna is a South Korean web series, written and directed by Lee Joo-young, and starring Bae Suzy in the title role, along with Jung Eun-chae, Kim Jun-han, and Park Ye-young. It premiered on Coupang Play, on June 24, 2022.

Synopsis 
The series tells the story of a woman who lives a completely different life starting with a small lie.

Cast

Main 
 Bae Suzy as Lee Yumi / Lee Anna
 Kim Soo-in as 14-year-old Yumi
 Choi So-yul as 6-year-old Yumi  
 A woman who loses her true identity and starts living a new, unpredictable life under a new name because of a minor lie that she made up.
 Jung Eun-chae as Lee Hyeon-ju
 Yumi's former boss. Born in to wealthy family, she runs a gallery owned by her father where Yumi was a terminal employee.
 Kim Jun-han as Choi Ji-hoon
 Yumi's husband. An ambitious, goal-oriented man. He is the CEO of a promising venture company, his own business he started at a young age.
 Park Ye-young as Ji-won
 Yumi's only confidante. A senior in the editorial department of a university school magazine.

Supporting 
 Kim Jung-young as Hong-joo
 Yumi's deaf mother.
 Choi Yong-jin as Lee Sang-ho
 Yumi's father, a tailor.
 Heo Hyeong-gyu as Kang Jae-ho
 A college student Yumi dated while she was pretending to be a college student.
 Woo Ji-hyun as Seon-woo 
 An employee at a restaurant owned by Hyeon-ju.
 Kim Soo-jin as Chief Kim 
 An employee at Hyeon-ju's company who took care of Yumi.
 Oh Man-seok as Mr. Lee
 Hyeon-ju's father and owner of the gallery where Yumi worked.
 Baek Ji-won as Hyeon-ju's mother
 The director of the gallery where Yumi worked.
 Yoon Ji-min as Professor Yoon
 Hong Hee-won as Secretary Jung
 Chu Kwi-jung as Jae-Ho's mother
 Jang Ha-eun as Narae, student at Yale University.
 Lee Je-yeon as Music teacher
 Park Soo-yeon as Secretary Cho Yu-mi

Production 
Filming of the series began on October 15, 2021 and concluded on March 23, 2022.

Controversy 
On August 2, 2022, director Lee Joo-young accused Coupang Play for making major edits to the series without her consent. Though the final version of the series submitted by Lee was consisted of 8 episodes (45–61 minutes per episode), the series which premiered on July 24 consisted of 6 episodes (45–63 minutes per episode). Lee had requested to remove her name in the credits for director and screenplay, but that was ignored. 

In a statement a day later, Coupang Play explained that they found that the director's editing was significantly different from what was initially agreed with them but when they requested multiple times to edit according to what was agreed, director refused it. Hence Coupang Play edited the work to match the original production intent, with the consent of the producer and in accordance with the rights stipulated in the contract. However, director Lee's side stated that she neither received request for corrections nor has she refused to do so. Further more, both Lee and editor Kim Jung-hoon claimed that they never received any opinions regarding editing from Coupang Play.

Previously on July 8, Coupang Play had announced to release a extended version of the series in August. Amidst the controversy, it was revealed to be the director’s cut which consists of 8 episodes. It was released on August 12.

Accolades

References

External links 
 
 
 Anna at Daum 

Korean-language television shows
2022 web series debuts
2022 web series endings
South Korean drama web series
South Korean web series
South Korean pre-produced television series
Television shows based on South Korean novels
Psychological thriller television series
South Korean thriller television series